Mish is a traditional Egyptian cheese made from another cheese from yogurt.

Mish may also refer to:

People

Given named or nicknamed
 Mish Barber-Way (born 1985), Canadian singer
 Mish Cowan (born 1982), Australian Aussie-rules-football coach
 Mish Michaels (1968–2022), U.S. broadcast meteorologist

Surnamed
 Henry Mish, namesake of the Henry Mish Barn
 Jeanetta Calhoun Mish (born 1961), U.S. poet

Fictional characters
 Mish Mash, a fictional character from The Brave Little Toaster

Places
 Henry Mish Barn (Mish barn), Augusta County, Virginia, USA; a historic barn

Other uses
 "The Mish", a 1998 song by Che Fu off the album 2b S.Pacific
 Mish function

See also

 MishCatt, Costa Rican singer
 
 Mich (disambiguation)
 Mishmish (disambiguation)
 Mish Mash (disambiguation)
 Mash (disambiguation)